Tenuinaclia oberthueri is a moth in the  subfamily Arctiinae. It was described by Rothschild in 1911. It is found in Madagascar.

References

Natural History Museum Lepidoptera generic names catalog

Moths described in 1911
Arctiinae